Dumkhal is a small village in Narmada district of Gujarat, India. Population of Dumkhal village is 1285. The Maharashtra Major State Highway 1 ends at this village. The nearby sanctuary of Shoolpaneshwar is also called "Dumkhal Wildlife Sanctuary."

See also
 South Gujarat
Small and Beautiful village inhabited with Tribal people called Adivasi, Jungle Area, water fall in raining season. Historic Chuliya Humanji Temple on the way to visit.

References

Villages in Narmada district